, also known as , is a Japanese voice actress affiliated with Arts Vision.

Biography
Asakura won the Columbia Award for the new audition of Voice Newtype and changed her last name from Yamamoto on September 1, 2006. It was announced at THE iDOLM@STER 5th Anniversary The World is all one !! held on July 4, 2010 and Asakura replaced Yurina Hase for the role of Yukiho Hagiwara. Asakura ended her Twitter account on October 28, 2014. On August 18, 2017, Asakura announced her marriage on their blog. She gave birth to her first child on November 1, 2019 and her second child on May 6, 2022.

Filmography

Anime series
2006
 Mamotte! Lollipop – Rokka Wan
 Negima! Magister Negi Magi – Akira Okochi
 The Story of Saiunkoku – Kinren

2007
 Bamboo Blade – Takahashi
 The Story of Saiunkoku Second Series – Kinren

2008
 Telepathy Shōjo Ran – Mifuyu, Yuki

2009
 Hanasakeru Seishōnen– Lin Li Fang

2011
 The Idolmaster – Yukiho Hagiwara
 Sket Dance – Fumi Segawa (ep 34, 42, 53)

2012
 High School DxD – Asia Argento
 Lagrange: The Flower of Rin-ne – Machiko Iwabuchi
 Love, Chunibyo & Other Delusions – Kumin Tsuyuri
 Shakugan no Shana Final – Leanan-Sidhe

2013
A Certain Scientific Railgun S – Misaki Shokuhō
 The Devil Is a Part-Timer! – Emeralda Etūva
 High School DxD New – Asia Argento
 My Teen Romantic Comedy SNAFU – Meguri Shiromeguri

2014
 The Irregular at Magic High School – Keiko Kobayakawa
 Love, Chunibyo & Other Delusions -Heart Throb- – Kumin Tsuyuri
 Riddle Story of Devil – Isuke Inukai
 Strike the Blood – Octavia Meyer

2015
 High School DxD BorN – Asia Argento
 Fafner in the Azure: EXODUS – Saki Masaoka

2016
 Ao no Kanata no Four Rhythm - Misaki Tobisawa
 Keijo - Hikari Muromachi
 Regalia: The Three Sacred Stars - Aoi Konoe

2017
18if - Mirei Saegusa

2018
 High School DxD Hero – Asia Argento

2020
A Certain Scientific Railgun T – Misaki Shokuhō

2022
 The Devil Is a Part-Timer!! – Emeralda Etūva

Anime films
 Takanashi Rikka Kai: Gekijō-ban Chūnibyō Demo Koi ga Shitai! (2013) - Kumin Tsuyuri
 Love, Chunibyo & Other Delusions! Take on Me (2018) - Kumin Tsuyuri

Original video animation
 Mahō Sensei Negima! : Spring/Summer (2006) – Akira Ōkōchi
 Suki Desu Suzuki-kun!! (2010) – Sayaka Hoshino
 Hime Gal Paradise (2011) – Himeko Tachikawa
 Asa Made Jugyou Chu! (2012) – Ayana Kakinozaka
 Rinne no Lagrange: Kamogawa Days (2012) – Machiko Iwabuchi

Original net animation
 Puchimas! Petit Idolm@ster (2013) – Yukiho Hagiwara and Yukipo

Video games
 Wand of Fortune (2009) – Martha
 Wand of Fortune ~Mirai e no Prologue~ (2010) – Martha
 Criminal Girls (2010) – Yuko
 The Idolmaster 2 (2011) – Yukiho Hagiwara
 Wand of Fortune 2 ~Jikuu ni Shizumu Mokushiroku~ (2012) – Martha
 Witch's Garden (2012) – Akari Hinomiya
 Hanairo Heptagram (2012) – Izuki Wakamura
 The Idolmaster Shiny Festa (2012) – Yukiho Hagiwara
 A Good Librarian Like a Good Shepherd (2013) – Sakuya Fumiya
 Chiisana Kanojo no Serenade (2013) – Shione Katagai
 Ao no Kanata no Four Rhythm (2016) – Misaki Tobisawa
 Tales of Berseria (2016) – Laphicet
 Idol Death Game TV (2016) – Mariko Kamata
 Granblue Fantasy (2018) – Fraux
 Azur Lane (2018) – U-47, U-557
 Girls' Frontline (2018) – S.A.T.8, Zas M21
 Arknights (2019) – Cardigan / Specter
 Massage Freaks (2022) – Manamo Yukishiro

Musical performances
Asakura participated in several albums and live concerts in connection with the role of Yukiho Hagiwara in THE iDOLM@STER franchise, replacing Yurina Hase in 2011.

References

External links
  
 Official agency profile 
 
 

1987 births
Living people
Japanese video game actresses
Japanese voice actresses
Voice actresses from Kanagawa Prefecture
20th-century Japanese actresses
20th-century Japanese women singers
20th-century Japanese singers
21st-century Japanese actresses
21st-century Japanese women singers
21st-century Japanese singers
Arts Vision voice actors